As of  , Guangxi Beibu Gulf Airlines (GX Airlines) serves 28 destinations in the China.

References 

GX Airlines